Methylobacterium nodulans is an aerobic, facultatively methylotrophic, legume root nodule-forming and nitrogen-fixing bacteria.

References

Further reading

External links

LPSN
Type strain of Methylobacterium nodulans at BacDive -  the Bacterial Diversity Metadatabase

Hyphomicrobiales
Bacteria described in 2004